Same-sex marriage has been legal in Colima since 12 June 2016. On 25 May 2016, a bill to legalise same-sex marriage passed the Congress of Colima and was published as law in the state's official journal on 11 June. It came into effect the next day. Colima had previously recognized same-sex civil unions, but this "separate but equal" treatment of granting civil unions to same-sex couples and marriage to opposite-sex couples was declared discriminatory by the Supreme Court of Justice of the Nation in June 2015. Congress had passed a civil union bill in 2013 but repealed it in 2016 shortly before the legalization of same-sex marriage.

Civil unions
On 4 July 2013, the Congress of Colima approved an amendment to article 147 of the State Constitution to establish same-sex civil unions. Within 30 days, seven of Colima's ten municipalities had approved the constitutional change. A group of citizens filed a lawsuit challenging the reform, arguing that providing only civil unions to same-sex couples and marriage to opposite-sex couples was discrimination on the basis of sexual orientation. On 18 March 2015, a district court judge declared that "separate but equal treatment is discriminatory" and unconstitutional. The decision also stated that section 201 of the Civil Code, which defined gendered roles for men and women, was discriminatory and reiterated that adoption open to heterosexual married couples must also be open to same-sex couples. Shortly after the ruling, a local LGBT group announced it would help any couple who joined in a civil union to receive a marriage license. The state appealed the ruling, and on 17 June 2015 the Mexican Supreme Court agreed that the "separate but equal" union laws violated the Constitution of Mexico. The state subsequently announced that it would repeal article 147 and pass a same-sex marriage law.

On 5 May 2016, Congress unanimously repealed the civil union provisions. All unions performed before the repeal are recognized by the state and can be converted into marriage upon request.

Same-sex marriage

Background

On 22 January 2013, the civil registrar of Cuauhtémoc received a request for a marriage license from a same-sex couple. After a team of lawyers reviewed the petition, Mayor Indira Vizcaíno Silva granted the first marriage license to a same-sex couple in Colima on 27 February 2013. The municipality performed a second same-sex marriage (and the first lesbian union) on 25 March 2013. A third same-sex marriage in Cuauhtémoc was held on 4 April 2013 for a lesbian couple, and the registrar announced at the time that there were 20 to 30 additional marriages scheduled on the calendar. Vizcaíno Silva said in March 2013 that a local survey had shown that eight out of ten residents supported the municipality's decision to issue marriage licenses to same-sex couples.

In June 2013, Judge Rosa Lilia Vargas Valle of the Second District Court ruled that the Colima Civil Code was unconstitutional in limiting marriage to opposite-sex couples.

Constitutional ban
On 4 July 2013, alongside formalizing civil unions, the state Congress also approved an amendment to article 147 of the Colima Constitution defining marriage as the "union between a man and a woman", thus constitutionally banning same-sex marriage. Congress voted unanimously to repeal article 147 on 5 May 2016, ending civil unions and removing the same-sex marriage ban.

Legislative action
Following the Mexican Supreme Court's ruling on 17 June 2015 that a "separate but equal" treatment for same-sex couples is discriminatory and unconstitutional, the Party of the Democratic Revolution (PRD) submitted a same-sex marriage bill to Congress. The law would ensure that married same-sex couples enjoy the same rights, benefits and responsibilities as married opposite-sex couples, including tax benefits, immigration rights, property rights, inheritance, adoption rights, etc. A vote on the legislation was scheduled for May 2016. The bill was approved on 25 May 2016 in a unanimous 24–0 vote. It was published in the state's official journal on 11 June, following Governor José Ignacio Peralta's signature, and came into effect the following day.

Statistics
The following table shows the number of same-sex marriages performed in Colima as reported by the National Institute of Statistics and Geography.

Public opinion
A 2017 opinion poll conducted by Gabinete de Comunicación Estratégica found that 47% of Colima residents supported same-sex marriage; another 47% were opposed.

According to a 2018 survey by the National Institute of Statistics and Geography, 39% of the Colima public opposed same-sex marriage.

See also

 Same-sex marriage in Mexico
 LGBT rights in Mexico

References

External links
 Text of the Colima same-sex marriage law in Spanish

Colima
Colima
2016 in LGBT history